The Śrīmālādevī Siṃhanāda Sūtra (of Queen Śrīmālā) is one of the main early Mahāyāna Buddhist texts belonging to the Tathāgatagarbha sūtras that teaches the doctrines of Buddha-nature and "One Vehicle" through the words of the Indian queen Śrīmālā. After its composition, this text became the primary scriptural advocate in India for the universal potentiality of Buddhahood.

History

Brian Edward Brown, a specialist in Buddha-nature doctrines, writes that the composition of the Śrīmālādevī Siṃhanāda Sūtra occurred during the Īkṣvāku Dynasty in the 3rd century CE as a product of the Caitika schools of the Mahāsāṃghikas. Alex Wayman has outlined eleven points of complete agreement between the Mahāsāṃghikas and the Śrīmālā, along with four major arguments for this association. Anthony Barber also associates the earlier development of the Tathāgatagarbha Sūtra with the Mahāsāṃghikas, and concludes that the Mahāsāṃghikas of the Āndhra region were responsible for the inception of the Buddha-nature doctrine. In the 6th century CE, Paramārtha wrote that the Mahāsāṃghikas revere the sūtras that teach the Buddha-nature doctrine.

Translations
The Śrīmālādevī Siṃhanāda Sūtra was translated to Chinese in 436 CE by Guṇabhadra (394-468) and later by Bodhiruci (672-727). A complete Sanskrit original is no longer extant, but extensive quotations are found in the Sanskrit text of the Ratnagotravibhāga as well as some recently discovered fragments conserved in the Schøyen Collection.  It was later translated into English by Alex and Hideko Wayman as The Lion's Roar of Queen Srimala.

Content
The Śrīmālādevī Siṃhanāda Sūtra teaches the reality of an ultimate, immaculate consciousness within each living being, which is the Buddhic "Dharmakāya" (essence of Truth), which is yet temporarily sheathed in obscuring defilement. This Dharmakāya, when viewed as intrinsically free from spiritual ignorance, is said to constitute eternity, bliss, the self, and purity in their perfect state. The use of the word "self" in this sutra is in a way unique to this class of sutra. The great Queen Śrīmālā, who according to this text is empowered by the Buddha to teach the Dharma, affirms:

The scripture, which was extremely influential by way of clarification of the Tathagātagarbha view of Śūnyatā, insists that the ultimately correct understanding of emptiness is that the Tathāgatagarbha is empty of all knowledge that is not liberation, whereas, in contrast, the qualities which characterise a Buddha are not empty of inconceivable virtues. An alternative title offered by the Buddha for this sutra expresses this idea of an ultimate meaning to the emptiness doctrine: "The True Revelation of the Buddha's Intention when Teaching Emptiness."

The sūtra has, furthermore, significantly contributed to the Mahāyāna notion of the permanent, steadfast and eternal Tathagātagarbha, which is nothing less than the perfect Dharmakāya temporarily concealed by (ultimately unreal) mental contaminants.

There is some debate as to whether or not the Tathagātagarbha constitutes true self or not, but this is explicitly refuted in the text:

See also 
 Aṅgulimālīya Sūtra
 Anunatva-Apurnatva-Nirdesa
 Ātman (Buddhism)
 Mahāyāna Mahāparinirvāṇa Sūtra
 Purity in Buddhism
 Shōmangyō Gisho (an annotated Japanese version of the sutra)

Notes

Sources

Bibliography
 Paul, Diana (1979). 'The Concept of Tathāgatagarbha in the Śrīmālādevī Sūtra (Sheng-Man Ching)'. Journal of the American Oriental Society 99 (2), 191–203
 Mark Dennis (trans.). Prince Shōtoku's Commentary on the Śrīmālā-sūtra, Berkeley, Numata Center for Buddhist Translation and Research 2011. 
King, Richard (1995). Is "Buddha-Nature" Buddhist? Doctrinal Tensions in the Śrīmālā Sūtra: An Early Tathāgatagarbha Text, Numen 42 (1), 1-20

External links 
 Digital Dictionary of Buddhism (log in with userID "guest")
 Appreciation of the Nirvana Sutra and Tathagatagarbha teachings

Mahayana sutras
Yogacara
Shentong